In questo mondo di ladri is a 2004 Italian comedy film directed by Carlo Vanzina.

Cast
Carlo Buccirosso as Fabio Di Nardo
Valeria Marini as Monica Puddu
Biagio Izzo as Nicola
Enzo Iacchetti as Lionello
Max Pisu as Walter
Ricky Tognazzi as Signor Gastone
Leo Gullotta as Colonel Leonardo

References

External links

In questo mondo di ladri at Variety Distribution

2004 films
Films directed by Carlo Vanzina
2000s Italian-language films
2004 comedy films
Italian comedy films
2000s Italian films